2 Bloor East is an office and retail complex in Toronto, Ontario, Canada, formerly known as the Hudson's Bay Centre. It is located in Downtown Toronto at the intersection of Yonge Street and Bloor Street at the east end of the Mink Mile. Brookfield Properties owns and operates the centre. The centre is composed of a 35-storey office tower and a retail concourse. From its opening in 1974 until 2022 it had a Hudson's Bay department store as its anchor store.

Description
The tower stands at 135 metres in height. The extensive retail concourse was anchored by a flagship store of Hudson's Bay/The Bay (known as the "Toronto, on Bloor Street" store at 44 Bloor Street East, the main brand of HBC. The mall contains over 45 specialty shops, boutiques, services and eateries. The complex also includes the Marriott Hotel, an RBC Royal Bank branch, a Jack Astor's Bar and Grill, apartments, and condominiums.

The centre has space for 1,200 cars in its underground and above-ground parking lots, multiple entrances located on Yonge, Bloor Streets, Park Road and Asquith Avenue and is surrounded by several parks and the Yorkville neighborhood which is known for upscale shopping.

The building is connected to the Bloor–Yonge subway station, the TTC's major east-west/north-south transfer point. There are also below-grade connections to the Holt Renfrew Centre and Cumberland Terrace, which continues westward to 60 Bloor Street West and Manulife Centre. The pedestrian tunnels stretches along Bloor Street West to the Bay subway station, making this Toronto's largest underground network after PATH.

History

Completed in 1974, the International style office skyscraper has served as the headquarters for the retailer Hudson's Bay Company (HBC). The company remained the main tenant until 2022, although the company relocated its head office to the Simpson Tower in 1978. The department store opened with the tower and was the first location of The Bay within the former city of Toronto. It overtook the Winnipeg location to become the flagship branch of The Bay (despite being actually smaller in size than the former) and maintained this distinction until the conversion in 1991 of the larger Simpsons store also located in Toronto.

In 2013, it was announced that the  Hudson's Bay/The Bay store could undergo a  renovation to become the Canadian flagship location of Saks Fifth Avenue, the American luxury department store chain which is now also owned by Hudson's Bay Company (HBC). However, it was subsequently announced that HBC would instead be renovating its flagship Hudson's Bay store at Yonge and Queen to include a 150,000 square foot Saks Fifth Avenue, and would leave the Yonge and Bloor location as a Hudson's Bay store.

In August 2014, the centre became the subject of controversy when its property manager, Brookfield Properties Ltd, admitted to regularly confiscating bicycles that were locked to a pole on a municipal right of way on Bloor St. outside of the mall. Many Torontonians accused the centre of theft and the City of Toronto assigned by-law officers to investigate.

In 2021, the iconic "The Bay" signage that was displayed on top of the office tower for nearly 50 years was removed. The following year, the Hudson's Bay Company announced that the Yonge and Bloor department store would close at the end of May 2022, and the site is expected to be redeveloped in conjunction with a major overhaul of the Bloor-Yonge TTC station. The store finally closed on May 13, 2022.

References

Note

External links
 
 

Skyscrapers in Toronto
Modernist architecture in Canada
Hudson's Bay Company
Brookfield Properties buildings
1974 establishments in Ontario
Skyscraper office buildings in Canada
Retail buildings in Canada
Office buildings completed in 1974